Walter Miller was an American football coach.  He was the head football coach at Bethel College in North Newton, Kansas, serving for one season, in 1928, and compiling a record of 0–7.

Head coaching record

References

Year of birth missing
Year of death missing
Bethel Threshers football coaches